Pagida is a genus of crab spiders family Thomisidae.

Pagida may also refer to:
 A place near Aiud in Alba county, Romania